The Heaven's Peak Fire Lookout in Glacier National Park, Montana, USA, is significant as one of a chain of staffed fire lookout posts within the park. The one-story timber-construction with a flat roof was built in 1945. The flat, overhanging roof is anchored to the stone foundation with cables.

The lookout was to be built in 1940 by local contractor Ole Norden as part of a Public Works Administration project. However, Norden was unable to perform the work and it was completed in 1945 under a different contract.

References

Government buildings completed in 1945
Towers completed in 1945
National Park Service rustic in Montana
Fire lookout towers on the National Register of Historic Places in Montana
National Register of Historic Places in Flathead County, Montana
1945 establishments in Montana
National Register of Historic Places in Glacier National Park